Herona is a genus of butterflies in the family Nymphalidae.

Species
Herona marathus Doubleday, [1848] – pasha
Herona sumatrana Moore, 1881

External links
"Herona Doubleday, [1848]" at Markku Savela's Lepidoptera and Some Other Life Forms (Funet)

 
Apaturinae
Nymphalidae genera
Taxa named by Henry Doubleday